Juan Camilo Becerra Maya (born 23 February 1998) is a Colombian professional footballer who plays as a forward for Spanish club RCD Espanyol.

Club career
Born in Valledupar, Becerra moved to Spain in July 2016 to play for Granada CF, after impressing in an Udinese Calcio academy in Barranquilla. After impressing with the Juvenil A squad, he made his senior debut with the reserves on 12 May 2017, coming on as a late substitute for compatriot Luis Suárez in a 2–1 Segunda División B home win against Córdoba CF B.

In July 2017, Becerra had his federative rights bought by Watford, and subsequently moved on loan to Real Valladolid Promesas, also in the third division, for one year. In the following two seasons, he also appeared in the same category after representing CD Teruel and UE Cornellà, also on loan.

On 25 August 2020, Becerra signed a three-year contract with RCD Espanyol, and was initially assigned to the B-team also in the third level. On 6 July of the following year, after scoring 11 goals, he moved to Segunda División side SD Ponferradina on a one-year loan deal.

Becerra made his professional debut on 14 August 2021, coming on as a late substitute for Yuri de Souza in a 1–0 home win over AD Alcorcón. The following 31 January, after just 69 minutes of actions in six matches overall, his loan was cut short, and he moved to Primera División RFEF side Gimnàstic de Tarragona just hours later.

References

External links

1998 births
Living people
People from Valledupar
Colombian footballers
Association football forwards
Segunda División players
Primera Federación players
Segunda División B players
Club Recreativo Granada players
Real Valladolid Promesas players
CD Teruel footballers
UE Cornellà players
RCD Espanyol B footballers
SD Ponferradina players
Gimnàstic de Tarragona footballers
Watford F.C. players
Colombian expatriate footballers
Colombian expatriate sportspeople in Spain
Expatriate footballers in Spain